The 2018 National People's Congress, or the First Session of the 13th National People's Congress, was held in March 2018 at the Great Hall of the People in Beijing, China. The session opened on 5 March and concluded on 20 March. Major state positions were elected in this session.

The Chinese Communist Party proposed amending the Constitution, for the first time after 2004, including writing Scientific Outlook on Development and Xi Jinping Thought into the Preamble, and removing the provision that the President and Vice President "shall serve no more than two consecutive terms" from the Constitution.  Amending the Constitution of China requires a majority vote of two-thirds of all the deputies to the Congress. On 11 March 2018, the Congress passed the amendment in the third plenary meeting of this session, attended by 2,964 out of 2,980 deputies, with 2,958 votes for, two against, three abstaining, and one void.

On 17 March 2018, Xi Jinping, General Secretary of the Chinese Communist Party, was unanimously re-elected as the President of the People's Republic of China and the Chairman of the Central Military Commission, and Li Zhanshu was elected as the Chairman of the Standing Committee of the National People's Congress.

Li Keqiang was nominated as the Premier by President Xi Jinping and approved by the Congress on 18 March 2018. Han Zheng, Sun Chunlan, Hu Chunhua and Liu He are nominated as the Vice Premiers by Premier Li Keqiang and approved by the Congress on 19 March 2018.

Election results

Legislation and resolutions

Elected Members 

Below is the number of deputies elected from each delegation.

Source:

References

External links

March 2018 events in China
National People's Congresses